The sulphur-bellied tyrant-manakin (Neopelma sulphureiventer), or sulphur-bellied neopelma, is a species of bird in the family Pipridae.  It is found in the western Amazon Basin of Bolivia, Brazil and Peru.  Its natural habitat is subtropical or tropical moist lowland forest.

References

sulphur-bellied tyrant-manakin
Birds of the Amazon Basin
Birds of the Peruvian Amazon
Birds of the Bolivian Amazon
sulphur-bellied tyrant-manakin
sulphur-bellied tyrant-manakin
Taxonomy articles created by Polbot